Assaf Al-Qarni (born April 2, 1984) is a Saudi Arabian football goalkeeper who represented Saudi Arabia in the 2007 Asian Cup.

He was named in Saudi Arabia's preliminary squad for the 2018 World Cup in Russia.

Honours
Al-Ittihad
Saudi Crown Prince Cup: 2016–17
King Cup: 2018

References

External links

1984 births
Living people
Saudi Arabian footballers
Saudi Arabia international footballers
2007 AFC Asian Cup players
Al-Wehda Club (Mecca) players
Ittihad FC players
Association football goalkeepers
Saudi First Division League players
Saudi Professional League players